Sha Ra is  an actor known for acting in Meesaya Murukku and Iruttu Araiyil Murattu Kuththu. He is the co-founder of the YouTube channel Temple Monkeys, a Tamil-language YouTube channel, along with Vijay Varadharaj.

Career
Thinkal Menon of The Times of India wrote that "Shah Ra’s comic timing works to a good extent".

Filmography

References

External links
 

Living people
Indian radio presenters
Television personalities from Tamil Nadu
Tamil comedians
Indian YouTubers
Indian male comedians
1985 births